David Lodge may refer to:

 David Lodge (actor) (1921–2003), British character actor
 David Lodge (author) (born 1935), British author
 David Lodge (neuroscientist), Research Fellow at the University of Bristol
 David Lodge (voice actor), American voice actor
 David Lodge (biologist) (born 1957), American biologist